Hugh May (13 October 1882 – 1944) was a Scottish footballer who played in the Football League for Derby County.

His elder brother John was also a footballer and was capped by Scotland.

References

1882 births
1944 deaths
Scottish footballers
English Football League players
Association football forwards
Wishaw F.C. players
Rangers F.C. players
Derby County F.C. players
Fulham F.C. players
Sportspeople from Shotts
Footballers from North Lanarkshire